Bikramjit Debnath (born 26 December 1998) is an Indian cricketer. He made his List A debut for Tripura in the 2018–19 Vijay Hazare Trophy on 19 September 2018.

References

External links
 

1998 births
Living people
Indian cricketers
Tripura cricketers
Place of birth missing (living people)